The Palmer and Company, Limited, often simply called Palmer and Co. was an Agency House in British India founded by John Horsley Palmer. Palmer and Co. was the largest Agency House in British India.

History

Background 

Before the advent of joint-stock banking companies in India, the role of banks was played by agency houses. The agency houses performed various quasi-banking functions which included but were not limited to:

 Accepting deposits (agency houses accepted deposits only from British nationals and other Europeans)
 Financing trade
 Lending of money (primarily to the Government)

Business 

The Palmer and Co. was founded with the name Paxton, Cockerell and Trail. Their name was later changed to Palmer and Co.

In 1829, Palmer and Co. financed and exported more than 16% of all the Indigo produced in British India. As a result, Palmer and Co. came to be known as the Indigo King of Bengal.

Failure 

The Palmer and Co. agency house failed in the year 1830 due to major economic downturn affecting the British India. The main cause of the economic crisis was the unexpected fall in the prices of commodities such as Indigo.

Controversies 

Charles Russell (1786–1856) was implicated in a corruption scandal where Lord Hastings, a Governor-General of India, was alleged to have acted partially on behalf of Palmer and Company, a Hyderabad banking house. The Russells were found to have to have been involved in and profited from the firm's dealings with the Nizam of Hyderabad, Mir Akbar Ali Khan, directly from Hastings' 1816 decision to exempt the house from a ban on lending money to native princes. Henry Russell's successor, Sir Charles Metcalfe, discovered a loan in 1820 that was both fictitious and fraudulent.

See also

 Banking in India
 Company rule in India
 Economy of India under Company rule

References

External links
 History of Palmer and Company
 History of Palmer and Company

Economic history of India
Trading companies of the United Kingdom
Companies based in Hyderabad, India